Aranjaanam is a 1982 Indian Malayalam-language film, directed by P. Venu and produced by P. K. Gopi. The film stars Shankar, Rajkumar, Subhashini and Sumalatha. The film has musical score and songs composed by K. J. Joy.

Cast
Shankar as Madhu
Rajkumar as Rajesh
Subhashini as Priya
Sumalatha as Anu
Sukumari as Pappi
Jagathy Sreekumar as Professor
 Jose Prakash as Colonel

Soundtrack
The music was composed by K. J. Joy and the lyrics were written by P. Bhaskaran.

References

External links
 

1982 films
1980s Malayalam-language films
Films directed by P. Venu